Shelbyville High School is located in Shelbyville, Shelby County, Illinois, United States. It is a part of Community Unit School District 4. The school draws students from the towns of Shelbyville, Lakewood, and Westervelt.

Athletics
Shelbyville’s High School athletics participate in the Central Illinois Conference and are members of the Illinois High School Association.

Boys
Baseball
Basketball
Cross Country
Football
Golf
Swimming & Diving
Tennis
Track & Field
Wrestling

Girls
Basketball
Cheerleading
Cross Country
Golf
Softball
Swimming & Diving
Tennis
Track & Field
Volleyball

Notable team state finishes
Boys Basketball: 1995–96 (1st), 1914–15 (3rd), 1917–18 (4th)
Boys Cross Country: 2015–16 (2nd), 2012–13 (3rd)
Competitive Cheering : 2005–06 (1st)
Softball: 2010–11 (2nd)
Volleyball: 1991–92 (2nd), 1983–84 & 2015–16 (4th)

Notable alumni
 George A. Bowman, Wisconsin State Assemblyman

See also
List of high schools in Illinois

External links
 School Website

References

Public high schools in Illinois
Education in Shelby County, Illinois